Italy has a long history of different coinage types, which spans thousands of years. Italy has been influential at a coinage point of view: the florin, one of the most used coinage types in European history, was struck in Florence in the 13th century. Since Italy has been for centuries divided into many city-states, they all had different coinage systems, but when the country became unified in 1861, the Italian lira came into place, and was used until 2002. Today, Italy uses the euro.

History

Ancient Rome and Ancient Greece

Despite the fact that the first Italian coinage systems were used in the Magna Graecia and Etruscan civilization, the Romans introduced a widespread currency throughout Italy. Unlike most modern coins, Roman coins had intrinsic value. While they contained precious metals, the value of a coin was higher than its precious metal content, so they were not bullion. Estimates of their value range from 1.6 to 2.85 times their metal content, thought to equal the purchasing power of 10 modern British Pound Sterling (US$15) at the beginning of the Roman Empire to around 18 Pound Sterling (US$29) by its end (comparing bread, wine and meat prices) and, over the same period, around one to three days' pay for a Legionnaire.

Middle Ages and Renaissance

Florin

The florin was struck from 1252 to 1523 with no significant change in its design or metal content standard. It had 54 grains of gold (3.5g). The "fiorino d'oro" of the Republic of Florence was the first European gold coin struck in sufficient quantities to play a significant commercial role since the seventh century. As many Florentine banks were international supercompanies with branches across Europe, the florin quickly became the dominant trade coin of Europe for large scale transactions, replacing silver bars in multiples of the mark (a weight unit equal to eight troy ounces).

In the fourteenth century, one hundred and fifty European states and local coin issuing authorities made their own copies of the florin. The most important of these was the Hungarian forint because the Kingdom of Hungary was a major source of gold mined in Europe (until the New World began to contribute to the supply in the sixteenth and seventeenth centuries, most of the gold used in Europe came from Africa).

Early modern history
The early modern Italian coins were very similar in style to French francs, especially in decimals, since it was ruled by the country in the Napoleonic Kingdom of Italy. They corresponded to a value of 0.29 grams of gold or 4.5 grams of silver.

Papal States scudo

The Papal States scudo was the coinage system used in the Papal States until 1866. Between 1798 and 1799, the revolutionary French forces established the Roman Republic, which issued coins denominated in baiocco and scudo. In addition, the states of Ancona, Civitavecchia, Clitunno, Foligno, Gubbio, Pergola and Perugia changed their coinage system to that of the Roman Republic.

In 1808, the Papal States were annexed by France, and French francs circulated as the official coins. When the Pope's authority was restored in 1814, the scudo was restored as the currency. However, the coinage of the individual states was not resumed. In 1849, another Roman Republic was established which issued coins centrally and in Ancona.

In 1866, the scudo was replaced by the lira, equivalent to the Italian lira. The exchange rate used was 5.375 lire = 1 scudo.

Parman lira

The Parman lira was Parma's official currency before 1802, and later revived from 1815 to 1859. The Duchy of Parma had its own coinage system until it was made a part of France in 1802. This lira was subdivided into 20 soldi (singular: soldo), each of 12 denari (singular: denaro), with the sesino worth 6 denari and the ducato was worth 7 lire. The currency was replaced by the French franc.

After the re-establishment of Parman independence, the Parman currency system was introduced in 1815. Also called the lira, it was subdivided into 20 soldi or 100 centesimi. However, this lira was equal to the French franc and the Sardinian lira, and it circulated alongside the latter. It weighed 5 grams, and had a purity of 9/10 of silver. Since 1861, Parma has used the equivalent Italian lira.

Neapolitan piastra

The Neapolitan piastra was the most common silver coin of the Kingdom of Naples. In order to distinguish it from the piastra issued on the island of Sicily, it is referred to as the "Neapolitan piastra" as opposed to the "Sicilian piastra". These two piastra were equal but were subdivided differently. The Neapolitan piastra was divided into 120 grana (singular: grano), each of 2 tornesi (singular: tornese) or 12 cavalli (singular: cavallo). There were also the carlino worth 10 grana and the ducato worth 100 grana.

Two Sicilies piastra
The Two Sicilies piastra was the coinage system or currency of the Kingdom of the Two Sicilies between 1815 and 1860. It was subdivided into 120 grana (singular: grano), each of 2 tornesi (singular: tornese). Accounts were kept in ducato, worth 100 grana.

Sardinian lira

The Sardinian lira was the currency of the Kingdom of Sardinia between 1816 and 1861. It was subdivided into 100 centesimi (singular centesimo ) and was equal in value to the French franc, which had replaced the Piedmontese and Sardinian scudos by 1799. It was replaced at par by the Italian lira.

Tuscan fiorino

The Tuscan fiorino was the currency of Tuscany between 1826 and 1859. It was subdivided into 100 quattrini (singular: quattrino), with an additional denomination called the paolo, worth 40 quattrini, in circulation.

Lombardy-Venetia florin
The Lombardy-Venetia florins were the coins of Lombardy-Venetia (reduced to the sole Venetia three years before) between 1862 and 1866. It replaced the pound at a rate of 1 florin = 3 pounds. The florin was equivalent to the Austro-Hungarian florin. Although it was subdivided into 100 soldi rather than 100 kreutzers, Austrian coins circulated in Venetia. The only coins issued specifically for Venetia were copper ½ and 1 soldo pieces.

Modern period (Kingdom and Republic of Italy)
The lira was made the official currency of Italy in 1861 after the Italian unification, however stopped being used in 2002. The euro coinage system entered circulation in Italy in 2002 and is currently the official currency.

Lira

Upon the creation of the Kingdom of Italy under Vittorio Emanuele II (1861), a unified lira was established, at 4.5 grams of silver or 290.322 milligrams of gold. This was a direct continuation of the Sardinian lira. Other currencies replaced by the Italian lira included the Lombardy-Venetia pound, the Two Sicilies piastra, the Tuscan fiorino, the Papal States scudo and the Parman lira. In 1865, Italy formed part of the Latin Monetary Union in which the lira was set as equal to, among others, the French, Belgian and Swiss francs: in fact, until the introduction of the euro in 2002, people speaking the Gallo-Italic dialects in north-western Italy usually called "franc" the lira.

World War I broke the Latin Monetary Union and resulted in prices rising severalfold in Italy. Inflation was curbed somewhat by Mussolini, who, on 18 August 1926, declared that the exchange rate between lira and pound would be £1 = 90 lire—the so-called Quota 90, although the free exchange rate had been closer to 140–150 lire per pound. In 1927, the lira was pegged to the U.S. dollar at a rate of 1 dollar = 19 lire. This rate lasted until 1934, with a separate "tourist" rate of US$1 = 24.89 lire being established in 1936. In 1939, the "official" rate was 19.8 lire.

After the Allied invasion of Italy, an exchange rate was set at US$1 = 120 lire (1 British pound = 480 lire) in June 1943, reduced to 100 lire the following month. In German-occupied areas, the exchange rate was set at 1 Reichsmark = 10 lire.

After the war, the Roman mint first issued the first 1, 2, 5 and 10 lira coins (6 September 1946). They were officially set up on 21 December of the same year and were used up to 1953–4. The value of the lira fluctuated, before Italy set a peg of US$1 = 575 lire within the Bretton Woods System in November 1947. Following the devaluation of the pound, Italy devalued to US$1 = 625 lire on 21 September 1949. This rate was maintained until the end of the Bretton Woods System in the early 1970s. Several episodes of high inflation followed until the lira was replaced by the euro.

The lira was the official unit of currency in Italy until 1 January 1999, when it was replaced by the euro (euro coins and notes were not introduced until 2002). Old lira denominated currency ceased to be legal tender on 28 February 2002. The conversion rate is 1,936.27 lire to the euro.
All lira banknotes in use immediately before the introduction of the euro, as all post WW2 coins, were still exchangeable for euros in all branches of the Bank of Italy until 29 February 2012.

Euro

The euro officially began circulating in Italy on 1 January 2002 (even though the creation of Italian lira coins was suspended in 1999). Italian euro coins have a design unique to each denomination, though there are many themes of works by one of the most renowned and famous Italian artists and painters. Each coin is designed by a different designer, from the 1 cent to the 2 euro coin they are: Eugenio Driutti, Luciana De Simoni, Ettore Lorenzo Frapiccini, Claudia Momoni, Maria Angela Cassol, Roberto Mauri, Laura Cretara and Maria Carmela Colaneri. All designs feature the 12 stars of the EU, the year of imprint, the overlapping letters "RI" for Repubblica Italiana (Italian Republic) and the letter R for Rome. There are no Italian euro coins dated earlier than 2002, even though they were certainly minted earlier, as they were first distributed to the public in December 2001.

See also

 Economic history of Italy

References 

Coins of Italy
Numismatics
Coins